Phumlile Sibonakele Ndzinisa (born 21 August 1992 in Hhohho, Swaziland) is a Swazi athlete. She competed in the 400 m event at the 2012 Summer Olympics in London where she was eliminated in the first round, but broke the national women's 400m record with 53.95 seconds.

She competed in the 100 m event for Swaziland at the 2016 Summer Olympics in Rio de Janeiro. She finished 5th in her preliminary round heat and did not qualify for the finals. She was the flag bearer for Swaziland during the closing ceremony.

References

1992 births
Living people
Swazi female sprinters
Olympic athletes of Eswatini
Commonwealth Games competitors for Eswatini
Athletes (track and field) at the 2012 Summer Olympics
Athletes (track and field) at the 2016 Summer Olympics
People from Hhohho Region
Athletes (track and field) at the 2014 Commonwealth Games
Athletes (track and field) at the 2018 Commonwealth Games
Athletes (track and field) at the 2019 African Games
African Games competitors for Eswatini
Olympic female sprinters